Colonel Frank Rutger Cervell (22 February 1907 – 3 September 1970) was an officer in the Swedish Air Force and a fencer. He won bronze medals in the team épée event at the 1948 Summer Olympics and 1937 World Championships, as well as a world championship silver in 1938.

Early life
Cervell was born on 22 February 1907 in Norrköping, Sweden, the son of consul Gustaf Johansson and his wife Anna Valentin.

Career
Cervell was commissioned as an officer in the Swedish Navy in 1930 with the rank of second lieutenant. He was promoted to lieutenant in 1934 and transferred to the Swedish Air Force in 1936 where he was promoted to captain in 1940 and major in 1944. Cervell served as air attaché in London and Oslo from 1943 to 1946 and as head of department in the Air Staff in 1946. He was then commanding officer of the Bråvalla Wing (F 13) from 1950 to 1959. Cervell was promoted to lieutenant Colonel in 1947 and to colonel in 1951. In 1959, he was appointed as air and naval attaché in Paris. Cervell served in this position until 1963.

He became Aide-de-camp to the Crown Prince in 1943 and chief Aide-de-camp to King Gustaf VI Adolf in 1951. Cervell was chairman of the board of the Gillette (Sweden) AB, Ludvig Wigart & C:os AB and H Unér AB. He was CEO of the Swedish Defence Material Export Promotion Group.

Personal life
In 1931, he married Louise Wigart (born 1907).

Dates of rank
1930 – Second lieutenant
1934 – Lieutenant
1940 – Captain
1944 – Major
1947 – Lieutenant colonel
1951 – Colonel

Awards and decorations

Swedish
   King Gustaf V's Jubilee Commemorative Medal (1948)
   Commander 1st Class of the Order of the Sword (6 June 1959)
   Knight of the Order of Vasa
   Swedish Women's Voluntary Defence Organization Royal Medal of Merit in silver

Foreign
   Commander of the Order of the Crown of Italy
   Honorary Commander of the Royal Victorian Order (June 1956)
  Knight of the Legion of Honour
  French de l'éducation physique
  French Air Force aviation badge
  Italian Air Force aviation badge

References

External links
 

1907 births
1970 deaths
Swedish Air Force colonels
Swedish air attachés
Swedish naval attachés
Swedish male épée fencers
Olympic fencers of Sweden
Fencers at the 1948 Summer Olympics
Olympic bronze medalists for Sweden
Olympic medalists in fencing
People from Norrköping
Medalists at the 1948 Summer Olympics
Commanders First Class of the Order of the Sword
Knights of the Order of Vasa
Sportspeople from Östergötland County